Zhang Yongming (1956 – January 10, 2013) was a Chinese serial killer and cannibal who was convicted of, and subsequently confessed to, the murder of 11 males between March 2008 and April 2012. It is believed that he fed flesh from some of his victims to his dogs and sold other parts at the local market, calling it "ostrich meat". He was executed on January 10, 2013.

Biography
Little is known about Zhang's early life. He was arrested and sentenced to death in 1979 for intentional homicide, but was released in September 1997 after receiving sentence reductions. Upon his release, he was given some land near his village of Nanmen in Jincheng Township, Jinning County, China.

Crimes
In early May 2012, the Ministry of Public Security of the People's Republic of China sent a team of investigators to Yunnan Province after media reports of missing teenagers in the area. One of the missing persons, a 19-year-old man, identified as Han Yao, was confirmed as having been murdered. The investigation showed that an alleged serial killer had begun attacking males who were walking along on a road near Zhang's home starting 2008. After the murders, it was alleged that Zhang used various means of disposing of the bodies, including dismemberment, burning and burial, to destroy the evidence.  Residents of Zhang's village stated they had seen plastic bags hanging from his home with what appeared to be bones protruding from them. Upon entering his home, police reported discovering human eyeballs preserved in bottles and what appeared to be human flesh drying. It was further alleged that Zhang fed his dogs flesh from some of his victims as well as selling it at the local market, calling it "ostrich meat".

Aftermath
During his trial, it was reported that Zhang refused to apologize for the killings and did not show any remorse. He was executed on January 10, 2013.

Twelve police officers were penalized for dereliction of duty regarding the murders, including Da Qiming, Jinning police chief, and Zhao Huiyun, head of the Jincheng Township police station, who were both dismissed from office.

See also 
Eight Immortals Restaurant murders
List of serial killers by country
List of serial killers by number of victims

References

1956 births
2008 murders in China
2010 murders in China
2012 murders in China
2013 deaths
21st-century Chinese criminals
21st-century executions by China
Cannibals
Chinese male criminals
Executed Chinese serial killers
Executed People's Republic of China people
Male serial killers
People convicted of murder by the People's Republic of China
People executed by China by firearm
Violence against men in Asia